is a passenger railway station in located in the city of Higashiōsaka,  Osaka Prefecture, Japan, operated by the private railway operator Kintetsu Railway.

Lines
Kawachi-Hanazono Station is served by the Nara Line, and is located 5.0 rail kilometers from the starting point of the line at Fuse Station and 11.1 kilometers from Ōsaka Namba Station.

Station layout
The station consists of two opposed elevated side platforms, with the station building located underneath.

Platforms

Adjacent stations

History
It was renamed  in December 1932. In 1941 it was transferred to the Kansai Kyūkō Railway, which became part of Kintetsu in 1944. On March 31, 1948  because of a brake failure of an express train for Uehommachi in the Ikoma tunnel, the train crashed with a local train at this station, killing 49.

Passenger statistics
In fiscal 2018, the station was used by an average of 10,987 passengers daily.

Surrounding area
Yoshida Kasuga Shrine (Rugby Shrine)
Osaka Prefectural Tamagawa High School

See also
List of railway stations in Japan

References

External links

 Kawachi-Hanazono Station 

Railway stations in Osaka Prefecture
Railway stations in Japan opened in 1914
Higashiōsaka